Dialectica spaces are a categorical way of constructing  models of linear logic.

They were introduced by Valeria de Paiva, Martin Hyland's student, in her doctoral thesis, as a way of modeling both linear logic and Gödel's Dialectica interpretation—hence the name.

Given a category C and a specific object K of C with certain (logical) properties, one can construct the category of Dialectica spaces over C, whose objects are  pairs of objects of C,  related by a C-morphism into K. Morphisms of Dialectica spaces are similar to Chu space morphisms, but instead of an equality condition, they have an inequality condition, which is read as a logical implication: the first object implies the second.

References 
 K. Gödel. "Uber eine bisher noch nicht benutzte Erweiterung des finiten Standpunktes - Dialectica", 1958. (Translation and analysis in Collected Works, Vol II, Publications, 1937-1974—eds S. Feferman et al., 1990).
 V. de Paiva. "The Dialectica Categories". In Proc. of Categories in Computer Science and Logic, Boulder, CO, 1987. Contemporary Mathematics, vol 92, American Mathematical Society, 1989 (eds. J. Gray and A. Scedrov)
 V. de Paiva. "A dialectica-like model of linear logic". In Proc. Conf. on Category Theory and Computer Science, Springer-Verlag Lecture Notes in Computer Science 389, pp. 341–356, Manchester, September 1989.

Category theory
Logic